

Winfrith was a medieval Bishop of Lichfield.

Winfrith was consecrated in 672 and deprived of his see between 672 and 676. He was deposed by Archbishop Theodore of Canterbury for disobedience.

Notes

Citations

References

External links
 

7th-century English bishops
Anglo-Saxon bishops of Lichfield